Sivatherium ("Shiva's beast", from Shiva and therium, Latinized form of Ancient Greek θηρίον - thēríon) is an extinct genus of giraffids that ranged throughout Africa to the Indian subcontinent. The species Sivatherium giganteum is, by weight, one of the largest giraffids known, and also one of the largest ruminants of all time.

Sivatherium originated during the Late Miocene (around 7 million years ago) in Africa and survived through to the late Early Pleistocene (Calabrian) S. giganteum remains have been recovered from the Himalayan foothills, dating around 1 million years ago. Suggestions have been made that S. maurusium may have gone extinct as recently as 8,000 years ago, as depictions that resemble it are known from ancient rock paintings in the Sahara and Central West India. But these claims are not substantiated by fossil evidence, and the depictions likely represent other animals.

Description

 

This would make Sivatherium one of the largest known ruminants, rivalling the modern giraffe and the largest bovines. This weight estimate is thought to be an underestimate, as it does not take into account the large horns possessed by males of the species. Sivatherium had a wide, antler-like pair of ossicones on its head, and a second pair of ossicones above its eyes. Its shoulders were very powerful to support the neck muscles required to lift the heavy skull. Sivatherium was initially misidentified as an archaic link between modern ruminants and the now obsolete, polyphyletic "pachyderms" (elephants, rhinoceroses, horses and tapirs). The confusion arose in part due to the graviportal (robust) morphology, which was unlike anything else studied at that time.

Diet 
A dental wear analysis of S. hendeyi from the Early Pliocene of South Africa found that the teeth were brachyodont, but had a higher hypsodonty than a giraffe, and that it was best classified as a mixed feeder, being able to both graze and browse.

See also

 Hydaspitherium
 Bramatherium
 Vishnutherium
 Prolibytherium

References

Further reading
Barry Cox, Colin Harrison, R.J.G. Savage, and Brian Gardiner. (1999): The Simon & Schuster Encyclopedia of Dinosaurs and Prehistoric Creatures: A Visual Who's Who of Prehistoric Life. Simon & Schuster.
David Norman. (2001): The Big Book Of Dinosaurs. pg. 228, Walcome books.
After the Dinosaurs: The Age of Mammals (Life of the Past) by Donald R. Prothero
The Evolution of Artiodactyls by Donald R. Prothero and Scott E. Foss
Vertebrate Palaeontology by Michael J. Benton and John Sibbick
Evolving Eden: An Illustrated Guide to the Evolution of the African Large Mammal Fauna by Alan Turner and Mauricio Anton
Classification of Mammals by Malcolm C. McKenna and Susan K. Bell  \
The Book of Life: An Illustrated History of the Evolution of Life on Earth, Second Edition by Stephen Jay Gould
 World Encyclopedia of Dinosaurs & Prehistoric Creatures: The Ultimate Visual Reference To 1000 Dinosaurs And Prehistoric Creatures Of Land, Air And Sea ... And Cretaceous Eras (World Encyclopedia) by Dougal Dixon
Eyewitness: Prehistoric Life by William Lindsay
Walker's Mammals of the World (2-Volume Set) (Walker's Mammals of the World) by Ronald M. Nowak
Horns, Tusks, and Flippers: The Evolution of Hoofed Mammals by Donald R. Prothero and Robert M. Schoch

External links

Miocene mammals of Africa
Pliocene mammals of Africa
Pleistocene mammals of Africa
Miocene mammals of Asia
Pliocene mammals of Asia
Pleistocene mammals of Asia
Prehistoric giraffes
Pliocene even-toed ungulates
Pleistocene even-toed ungulates
Prehistoric even-toed ungulate genera
Miocene first appearances
Pleistocene extinctions
Fossil taxa described in 1836